Ibrahim Al Hussein (born 23 September 1988) is a Syrian Paralympic swimmer who represented the Independent Paralympic Athletes Team at the 2016 Summer Paralympics and resides in Greece. He competed in the S9 50 m and 100 m freestyle events and served as a flag bearer at the 2016 Summer Paralympics Parade of Nations. He is a co-recipient of the 2016 Whang Youn Dai Achievement Award.

In June 2021 Ibrahim Al Hussein was chosen with four men and a woman to represent refugees at the 2020 Summer Paralympics in Tokyo. The six will be led by the Chef de Mission Ileana Rodriguez who was previously a parathlete swimmer for the US in 2012. The other five are the Syrian refugee club thrower Alia Issa who also lives in Athens, the Burundian refugee Parfait Hakizimana, the American-based Afghan refugee swimmer Abbas Karimi, the German-based Syrian refugee canoeist Anas Al Khalifa, and American based Iranian refugee discus thrower Shahrad Nasajpour.

References 

Swimmers at the 2016 Summer Paralympics
Refugees of the Syrian civil war
Syrian male freestyle swimmers
1988 births
Living people
Swimmers at the 2020 Summer Paralympics
S9-classified Paralympic swimmers